Charlotte of Nassau-Dillenburg-Schaumburg of Anhalt-Bernburg-Hoym (1672–1700) was the wife of Lebrecht, Prince of Anhalt-Zeitz-Hoym, a German prince of the House of Ascania.

Life 
Charlotte of Nassau-Dillenburg-Schaumburg was born on 25 September 1672 in Northrhine-Westphalia, Germany. She was heiress to the County of Holzappel and Lordship of Schaumburg and the youngest of three surviving daughters of Adolph, Prince of Nassau-Schaumburg. Charlotte was declared the sole heiress of the County of Holzappel (which included the towns of Holzappel and Charlottenberg) and the Lordship of Schaumburg.

By a contract made on 1 September 1690 between Victor Amadeus, Prince of Anhalt-Bernburg and Elisabeth Charlotte Melander, Countess of Holzappel, Charlotte was betrothed to Lebrecht, Prince of Anhalt-Zeitz-Hoym  The marriage was performed in Schaumburg on 12 April 1692. They had five children:
 Victor I Amadeus Adolph, Prince of Anhalt-Bernburg-Schaumburg-Hoym (Schaumburg, 7 September 1693 – Schaumburg, 15 April 1772).
 Frederick William (Schaumburg, 12 April 1695 – killed in action at Denain, 24 July 1712).
 Elisabeth Charlotte (Bernburg, 4 December 1696 – Schaumburg, 14 June 1754).
 Christian (Bernburg, 27 November 1698 – killed in action at Palermo, 29 April 1720).
 Victoria Hedwig (Bernburg, 30 January 1700 – Schaumburg, 10 February 1701).

She died, aged 27, on 31 January 1700, and is interred in the church of Saint Aegidien in Bernburg, Germany.

References

German princesses
1672 births
1700 deaths
Burials at Schlosskirche St. Aegidien (Bernburg)
House of Nassau-Schaumburg
Daughters of monarchs